WSEB (91.3 FM) is a radio station broadcasting a Christian format. Licensed to Englewood, Florida, United States, it serves the Venice and Port Charlotte areas.  The station is currently owned by Suncoast Educational Broadcasting Corp., with its transmitter near Rotonda West, in Charlotte County.

External links

SEB
Radio stations established in 1987
1987 establishments in Florida